SS Germaine was a Greek Cargo Ship that was torpedoed by U-48 in the Atlantic Ocean, while she was travelling from Albany, New York, United States to Cork, Ireland.

Construction 
Germaine was constructed in 1911 at the Charles Connell & Co. Ltd. shipyard in Scotstoun, United Kingdom. She was completed in 1911 and she was named Germaine and served from 1911 until her demise in 1939.
She had a Triple expansion steam engine driving a single screw propeller and the engine was rated at 536 nhp.

Sinking 
On 15 December 1939, Germaine was torpedoed and sunk by U-48 in the Atlantic Ocean, while she was travelling from Albany, New York, United States to Cork, Ireland with a cargo of Maize. There were no casualties, the survivors were saved by the Norwegian steamer SS Vlieland.

Wreck 

References

Steamships of Greece
Ships sunk with no fatalities
Cargo ships
1911 ships
Ships built on the River Clyde
Maritime incidents in December 1939
Ships sunk by German submarines in World War II
Shipwrecks in the Atlantic Ocean